A cricket tournament at the Pacific Games, previously the South Pacific Games, was introduced in 1979 and was played intermittently at games in the 1980s and 1990s, depending on the facilities of the host nation. Since 2003, cricket has featured at every Pacific Games. Detailed records of the tournaments prior to 2003 have not been kept and beyond knowing what teams won the gold and silver medals at each Games, little is known with certainty of the first three tournaments.

Performance by team
Legend
 – Gold
 – Silver
 – Bronze
GS – Group stage
Q – Qualified
 — Hosts

Men's tournament

Women's tournament

Results

1979
Venue: Suva, Fiji

Seven teams contested the first cricket tournament at the South Pacific Games.

PNG beat Tuvalu by 195 runs in their opening game, scoring 220/9 from 60 overs before bowling Tuvalu out for just 25 runs. Vavine Pala took 5/10. The game between Fiji and New Hebrides was unable to proceed due to a wet outfield. PNG later suffered a shock loss to Tonga before defeating Fiji in the semi-final by 20 runs. In the other semi-final New Hebrides defeated Tonga. PNG ultimately won the final by nine wickets after bowling the New Hebrides out for 53 runs, with 20-year-old fast bowler Mike Steven taking 8/27.

1987
Venue: Nouméa, New Caledonia

1991
Venue: Port Moresby/Lae, Papua New Guinea

2003

Venue: Suva, Fiji

2007

Venue: Apia, Samoa

Round robin tournament of limited overs cricket (maximum 50 overs per side).

2011

Venue: Noumea, New Caledonia

In 2011 the format was switched to the shorter Twenty20 game instead of the previous 50 over cricket. A round-robin stage was played before the two top teams met in the final.

2015

Venue: Port Moresby, Papua New Guinea

In 2015, a women's tournament was held for the first time alongside the men's tournament. The 20-over format was retained.

Men

Women

2019

Venue: Apia, Samoa

Tonga included both men's and women's cricket in its successful bid for the 2019 Pacific Games, to be held in Nukuʻalofa. However, Tonga withdrew from hosting in May 2017 and was replaced by Samoa.

Men

Women

Pacific Mini Games
For the first time, Vanuatu included a men's cricket tournament in its successful bid for the 2017 Pacific Mini Games, to be held in Port Vila. The cricket facilities near Korman Stadium are planned to be renovated before the tournament. However, the effects of Cyclone Pam in 2015 have, according to some sources, cast doubt upon the country's ability to host the games.

Records

As detailed results have not been kept for the first three tournaments, it is not possible to present detailed records. What is known is that Papua New Guinea's total of 572/7 against New Caledonia is the highest team total in any international one-day match, along with the winning margin of 510 runs, and therefore also in the South Pacific Games.

See also
Cricket in Oceania

Notes
 The number of teams at the tournaments has varied – there were seven teams in 1979, then four in 1987 and five in 1991. When the sport resumed at the 2003 games, six teams contested, but this number dropped to five in 2007 and four in 2011 and 2015 (for the men's tournament – the women's tournament had six teams).

 Samoa and Vanuatu competed as Western Samoa and the New Hebrides, respectively, at the 1979 games.

 1979: Pacific Islands Monthly reported Papua New Guinea defeating New Hebrides in the final to win gold, passing the required total of 53 with the loss of only one wicket. Fiji defeated Tonga in a much closer third place play-off to win bronze by two wickets, passing the formidable total set by Tonga of 183 for the loss of six wickets.

 1979: Roy Morgan's Encyclopedia of World Cricket indicates that Western Samoa finished fifth at the 1979 South Pacific Games.  They played New Caledonia in the fifth place play-off so New Caledonia are assumed to have finished sixth. Tuvalu finished seventh.

 1987: Roy Morgan's Encyclopedia of World Cricket indicates that Papua New Guinea defeated Fiji in the final to decide the gold and silver medals. The other three teams taking part were New Caledonia, the Solomon Islands and Vanuatu. The same book indicates that New Caledonia have never won an international match, so they are assumed to have finished fifth with either the Solomon Islands or Vanuatu winning the bronze or finishing fourth. 

 1991: Results presented here are based on sparse records. The official results from the SPG website list PNG, Fiji and Tonga as the gold, silver and bronze medalists, respectively. Roy Morgan's Encyclopedia of World Cricket indicates that Papua New Guinea defeated Fiji in the final to decide the gold and silver medals. However it did not mention Tonga, and noted only two other teams in the tournament, New Caledonia and Vanuatu. The same book indicates that New Caledonia have never won an international match, which might lend weight to the assumption that Vanuatu won the bronze medal. For this article, however, the official results are preferred.

References

 
Pacific Games
Pacific Games
Pacific Games